Adamou Moussa (born 1 January 1995) is a Nigerien international footballer plays for Saint-Josse.

International career

International goals
Scores and results list Niger's goal tally first.

References

External links 
 

1995 births
Living people
Nigerien footballers
Nigerien expatriate footballers
Niger international footballers
Association football forwards
Saudi Second Division players
AS FAN players
AS Douanes (Niger) players
KF Flamurtari players
AS SONIDEP players
Al-Taqadom FC players
Al-Sadd FC (Saudi football club) players
Nigerien expatriate sportspeople in Morocco
Nigerien expatriate sportspeople in Kosovo
Nigerien expatriate sportspeople in Saudi Arabia
Nigerien expatriate sportspeople in Belgium
Expatriate footballers in Morocco
Expatriate footballers in Kosovo
Expatriate footballers in Saudi Arabia
Expatriate footballers in Belgium
2016 African Nations Championship players
Niger A' international footballers
2020 African Nations Championship players